St Francis Rangers F.C. is a football club based in Haywards Heath, England.

History
The club was founded in 2002 from the amalgamation of St Francis FC and Ansty Rangers. The team were promoted from the third division of the Sussex County League in 2004 and were promoted again three years later. In the 2015-16 season, The Argus newspaper dubbed St Francis Rangers 'the worst football team in England' during a season where they only won once and were relegated (at the time the article was written, the team had lost all of the 23 games they had played up to that point) from the Premier Division of the Southern Combination Football League to Division One, where they remained until the club folded in December 2018.

On 23 May 2019, Whitehawk F.C. Under 18's manager Del Tobias and a partner, took on the club, re-founded it and re-entered the team into the 2019–20 Southern Combination Football League Division Two as an intermediate team with ambitions to rebuild the club.

References

Football clubs in England
Southern Combination Football League
Football clubs in West Sussex
Association football clubs established in 2002
2002 establishments in England
Haywards Heath